The United States Carriage Company is a historic building in Downtown Columbus, Ohio. It was listed on the Columbus Register of Historic Properties in 2014 and the National Register of Historic Places in 2015.

See also
 National Register of Historic Places listings in Columbus, Ohio

References

External links
 

Commercial buildings on the National Register of Historic Places in Ohio
Commercial buildings completed in 1902
National Register of Historic Places in Columbus, Ohio
Columbus Register properties
Buildings in downtown Columbus, Ohio